Major General Sir Simon Christie Cooper,  (born 1936) is a retired British Army officer who served as Major-General commanding the Household Division and General Officer Commanding London District and later Master of the Household to the Sovereign.

Military career
Born the son of Major General Kenneth Cooper and educated at Winchester College and at the Royal Military Academy Sandhurst, Cooper was commissioned into the Life Guards in 1956.

He served in Aden, then in London, and in the British Army of the Rhine from 1957 to 1963 when he became Adjutant of the Household Cavalry Regiment. He next became Aide-de-Camp to the Chief of the General Staff in 1965. In 1966 and 1967 he served in Borneo during the Indonesia–Malaysia confrontation and Malaya during the Malayan Emergency.

Cooper attended the Staff College, Camberley in 1968, and qualified as a staff officer. From 1969 to 1975 he was in the British Army of the Rhine, and was commanding officer of the Life Guards from 1974 to 1976. He then served as a General Staff Officer at the Staff College from 1976 to 1978 when he became officer commanding the Household Cavalry and Silver Stick to Her Majesty The Queen. In 1981 and 1982 he was officer commanding the Royal Armoured Corps Centre.

In 1983 Cooper attended the Royal College of Defence Studies. He was promoted to major general on 20 October 1983, and was Director of the Royal Armoured Corps from 1984 to 1987 when he was appointed Commandant of the Royal Military Academy Sandhurst. From 1989 to 1991 he was Major-General commanding the Household Division and General Officer Commanding London District. He retired on 26 August 1991.

He was Master of the Household to the Sovereign from 1992 to 2000. He was also made an Extra Equerry in 1992.

He was also made Honorary Colonel of the Royal Yeomanry (Westminster Dragoons) in 1987.

Cooper was appointed a Knight Commander of the Royal Victorian Order in 1991 on completion of his term commanding the Household Division, and was advanced to Knight Grand Cross of the Royal Victorian Order on his retirement as Master of the Household in 2000.

References

|-
 

|-

1936 births
Living people
British Army major generals
British Army personnel of the Malayan Emergency
Equerries
Knights Grand Cross of the Royal Victorian Order
British Life Guards officers
Graduates of the Royal Military Academy Sandhurst
People educated at Winchester College
Masters of the Household
University of Toronto alumni
Graduates of the Royal College of Defence Studies
Graduates of the Staff College, Camberley
Commandants of Sandhurst
Academics of the Staff College, Camberley